Hinduism is the fastest growing religion in Northern Ireland with over 2400 Hindus (up from 825 in 2001, a 188% increase) in the country, making up 0.13% (up from 0.05% in the 2001 census). There are currently 3 Mandirs in Belfast alone: Radha-Krishna Temple in Malone Road, Laxmi-Narayan Mandir in Clifton Street and Radha Madhava Mandir (ISKCON) in Upper Dunmurry Lane. There is also a Hare Krishna Centre on Inish Rath Island that was established in 1985.

Demographics

Hindu temples
List of Hindu temples in Northern Ireland

Belfast

Laxmi-Narayan Mandir, Clifton Street, Carlisle Circus, Belfast
Radha-Krishna Temple, 9 Malone Road, Belfast BT9 6RY
Sri Sri Radha – Madhava Belfast Temple (ISKCON), 140 Upper Dunmurry Lane, Brooklands Grange, Belfast BT17 OHE

Fermanagh
Temples in Fermanagh:
Sri Sri Radha Govinda Govindadwipa Temple Inis Rath Island (ISKCON), Lake Island of Inis Rath, Lisnaskea, BT92 2GN

See also

Hinduism in the Republic of Ireland
Hinduism in the United Kingdom
Hinduism in England
Hinduism in Scotland
Hinduism in Wales
Hindu Council UK
Sanskrit in the West
Religion in Northern Ireland

References

 

Hinduism in Ireland
Northern Ireland
Religion in Northern Ireland